James McIndoe (1824 – 4 September 1905) was a 19th-century Member of Parliament from Dunedin, New Zealand.

Born in Rothesay, Bute, Scotland, McIndoe emigrated to Otago in New Zealand in 1859. He was elected as a member of the Otago Provincial Council in 1867.

He was one of five candidates in the 1871 Roslyn by-election and came last.

McIndoe was marries to Elizabeth Gillies, a member of a prominent family many of whom also migrated to Dunedin. Her brothers included politicians Thomas, Robert, and John Lillie Gillies. James and Elizabeth had three children, among them the printer John McIndoe.

McIndoe took an interest in local history, publishing A Sketch of Otago in 1878. His newspaper submissions often appeared under the initials 'I.M.I.' He died in Dunedin on 4 September 1905, and was buried at Andersons Bay Cemetery.

References

1824 births
1905 deaths
19th-century New Zealand politicians
Burials at Andersons Bay Cemetery
Hill-McIndoe-Gillies family
Members of the New Zealand House of Representatives
Members of the Otago Provincial Council
New Zealand MPs for Dunedin electorates
Scottish emigrants to New Zealand